Dharowali is a village near Dera Baba Nanak, Gurdaspur District in Punjab state, India. The population was 1,154 at the 2001.

The residence of this village are mostly Jatt Randhawa and they are the descendants of Bhai Lakshman Singh Dharowali who was burnt alive upside down from a tree during Saka Nankana Sahib.

See also
 Saka Nankana

References

Villages in Gurdaspur district